Apel Mahmood is a Bangladeshi singer and freedom fighter. He is one of the performers of Swadhin Bangla Betar Kendra during the Liberation War of Bangladesh in 1971 and best known for the song "Mora Ekti Phulke Bachabo Bole Juddho Kori". He was awarded an Ekushey Padak, Bangladesh's second highest civilian award, in 2005 by the Government of Bangladesh for his contribution in music.

Early life
Mahmood was born on 22 December 1947 in what is now Daudkandi Upazila, Comilla District, Bangladesh, to MA Rahman and Amina Rahman.

Awards
Ekushey Padak (2005)

References

Living people
1947 births
Recipients of the Ekushey Padak in arts
20th-century Bangladeshi male singers
20th-century Bangladeshi singers
Comilla Victoria Government College alumni